Matthew Bell (1793–1871) was a Conservative Party politician in the United Kingdom who was a Member of Parliament (MP) for Northumberland, 1826–1831, and South Northumberland, 1832–1852.

References

External links 
 

1793 births
1871 deaths
UK MPs 1826–1830
UK MPs 1830–1831
UK MPs 1832–1835
UK MPs 1835–1837
UK MPs 1837–1841
UK MPs 1841–1847
UK MPs 1847–1852
Conservative Party (UK) MPs for English constituencies
Tory MPs (pre-1834)